The 2018 Little League Softball World Series was held in Portland, Oregon from August 8 to August 15, 2018. Six teams from the United States and four from throughout the world competed for the Little League Softball World Series Championship.

Teams
Each team that competed in the tournament came out of one of the 10 regions.

Results

All times US PST.

Elimination round

References

Little League Softball World Series
2018 in softball
2018 in sports in Oregon
Softball in Oregon